is a traditional school of Japanese martial arts. It was created by Kawakami Gensai in the 1860s, following his study of swordsmanship under the instructor Todoroki Buhē. Shiranui-ryū was characterized by high speed. Kawakami Gensai was its only practitioner as he was executed in 1872.

Fictional Portrayal
In the manga and anime Rurouni Kenshin, the sword style of Himura Kenshin (himself loosely based on Kawakami Gensai), the Hiten Mitsurugi-ryū (飛天御剣流, lit. "Flying Heaven's Honorable Sword Style") is loosely based on Shiranui-ryū; both styles are characterized by high-speed attacks.

References

Meiji Restoration
Ko-ryū bujutsu
Japanese martial arts